Seven is the seventh studio album by the British singer Lisa Stansfield, released on 31 January 2014. It was her first new album since The Moment in 2004. Seven was promoted by three singles: "Can't Dance", "Carry On" and "So Be It", and the European 2013–2014 Seven Tour. The album was re-released in October 2014, titled Seven+,  with one new song, "There Goes My Heart" and fifteen remixes. In the United Kingdom, it was released as a double album with the original track listing. In Europe, Seven+ was issued as a standalone album. The Live in Manchester album/video recorded during the Seven Tour was released on 28 August 2015.

Background and release
After releasing The Moment in 2004, Stansfield focused on acting. She played herself in the comedy series Monkey Trousers in mid-2005. In late 2006, she appeared in the drama series Goldplated, playing Trinny Jamieson. In September 2007, she appeared in another television series, Agatha Christie's Marple. She played Mary Durrant in the episode titled "Ordeal by Innocence". Later, she dubbed one of the characters (Millie, an elf) for the English version of the Finnish animated film Quest for a Heartm released in December 2007. She also recorded the title song "Quest for a Heart" written by Charlie Mole and Lee Hall and produced by Mole in collaboration with Ali Thomson. In 2007, Stansfield joined the cast of The Edge of Love directed by John Maybury. The film starred Keira Knightley, Sienna Miller, Cillian Murphy and Matthew Rhys and waspremiered in June 2008. Stansfield played the role of Ruth Williams. In mid-2009, she starred in the Nick Mead-directed documentary Dean Street Shuffle, playing herself. In 2012, Elaine Constantine gave her a role in Northern Soul, an independent docu-drama about the social phenomenon and generation of this music and dance movement. It was released in October 2014.

Stansfield's career has spanned over three decades, with sales of over twenty million records and a string of international top ten hits including "All Around the World", "Change", "All Woman" and "Someday (I'm Coming Back)". The Grammy-nominated, multi BRIT, Ivor Novello and Silver Clef Award winner returned to the studio in 2012 to record her next album with her long-time songwriting partner and husband Ian Devaney. She also embarked on the Seven Tour in May 2013 and ended it in November 2014. In August 2013, she announced that her seventh studio album, titled simply Seven, would be released in October 2013. However, on 16 October 2013, she announced on her Facebook page that the release date had been pushed back to early 2014. Seven was released on 31 January 2014 in Europe and 10 February 2014 in the United Kingdom. In October 2014, the album was re-released with new material as Seven+.

Content
Seven was produced and written in the United Kingdom by Stansfield and Devaney and includes tracks such as "Can't Dance", "The Rain", "Stupid Heart", "Conversation", "The Crown", "So Be It" and "Picket Fence". Recorded in both Los Angeles and Manchester, Stansfield collaborated with John Robinson and orchestrator Jerry Hey, both integral to the creation of Michael Jackson's Off the Wall, Thriller and Bad, who have worked with Stansfield for over two decades. Following her critically acclaimed return to live performance in 2013 – The Times wrote that Stansfield "still has the most distinctive and sensuous voice in soul pop" - Seven marked her return to the international stage and confirmsed her status as one of the UK's premier recording artists. The deluxe edition contains live versions of her previous hits, recorded during her show at the Sound Control in Manchester on 20 November 2012, and also a new version of "You Can't Deny It" remixed by Devaney.

In October 2014, the album was re-released as Seven+. In the UK, it was issued on 20 October 2014 as a two-disc edition with original track listing plus one new song, "There Goes My Heart" and fifteen remixes. In Europe, Seven+ was released as a single disc with "There Goes My Heart" and fifteen remixes on 31 October 2014. The songs were remixed by Cahill, Moto Blanco, Snowboy, Andy Lewis, Opolopo, Cool Million and Soul Talk.

Critical reception
Seven received favourable reviews. TheGayUKs Chris Jones wrote, "Finally, after 10 long years, she's back - but by god, it was worth the wait. Seven, Lisa's seventh album, gives us 10 tracks that make you cry, make you dance and make you glad you have ears!" Stephen Unwin in The Daily Express wrote, "And after a hiatus of almost 10 years, Lisa is back. Late 2012 saw her dipping her toes in with a few sell-out, intimate UK gigs, just to let everyone know that the voice is still spine-tingling, and to showcase a few tracks from this comeback album which are more-ishly good."

Commercial performance
Seven entered the charts in mid-February 2014 at number 13 in the United Kingdom and Germany, number 25 in Austria, number 32 in Czech Republic and number 42 in Switzerland. In the UK, Seven surpassed Stansfield's previous releases Face Up (number 38, 2001) and The Moment (number 57, 2004) at number 13 with sales of 5,930 sales. All of her first four studio albums made the top ten in the UK, including Lisa Stansfield (1997), which peaked at number two. In 2014, it was awarded a double silver certification from the Independent Music Companies Association, which indicated sales of 60,000 copies throughout Europe.

Track listing

Charts

Credits and personnel

Musicians
 Lisa Stansfield - lead and background vocals
 Davide Giovannini – drums
 John Robinson - drums
 Kevin Whitehead - drums
 Gary Crocket – bass guitar
 Neil Stubenhaus - bass guitar
 Davide Mantovani - double bass
 Al Cherry – guitar
 Paul Jackson, Jr. - guitars
 Randy Kerber - keyboards, piano, electric piano, clarinet, Hammond
 Ian Devany – piano, keyboards
 Peter Mokran - keyboards, guitar, programming
 Richard Cottle - piano, string arrangements
 Dave Oliver – hammond
 Snowboy – percussion
 Steve Vintner - orchestral percussion
 John Thirkell - trumpets, flugelhorn
 Gary Grant - trumpets
 Dan Fornero - trumpets
 Andy Martin - trombones
 Steve Haltman - trombones
 Mickey Donnelly - saxophones, flute
 Dan Higgins - saxophones
 Andrew Price - violin
 Clare Dixon - violin
 Karen Mainwaring - violin
 Rachel Porteous - violin
 Martin Wellington - viola
 Peter Dixon - cello
 Richard Harwood - cello
 Hugh Webb - harp
 Andrea Grant - backing vocals

Production
 Ian Devaney – producer
 Jerry Hey - co-producer
 Peter Mokran - co-producer, mixing
 Snowboy - co-producer
 Bernie Grundman - mastering
 Martin Rhodes - studio manager
 Philip Holmes - estate manager
 Stephen Boycs-Buckley - recording engineer
 Steve Sykes - recording engineer
 Michael Stern - recording engineer
 Robby Nelson - recording engineer
 Joy Glover - recording engineer
 George Apison - recording engineer
 Cristiano Verardo - recording engineer
 Adam Kelly - assistant engineer
 Jack Langfeld - assistant engineer
 Spencer Guerro - assistant engineer
 Morgan Strotton - assistant engineer
 Isabel Seeliger-Marley - assistant engineer
 Daniele Trevisanello - assistant engineer
 Eric Weaver - assistant engineer
 Eric Eylands - assistant engineer
 Rachel George - artist management

Release history

References

Lisa Stansfield albums
2014 albums